Makorin ring finger protein 3 is a protein that in humans is encoded by the MKRN3 gene.

Function

The protein encoded by this gene contains a RING (C3HC4) zinc finger motif and several C3H zinc finger motifs. This gene is intronless and imprinted, with expression only from the paternal allele. Disruption of the imprinting at this locus may contribute to Prader–Willi syndrome. An antisense RNA of unknown function has been found overlapping this gene.

References

Further reading